Wilfrid Nanou (born April 16, 1979 in Lyon) is a French professional football player.

He played on the professional level in Scottish Football League First Division for Raith Rovers F.C.

 1979 births
Living people
Footballers from Lyon
French footballers
French expatriate footballers
Expatriate footballers in Scotland
Raith Rovers F.C. players
Lyon La Duchère players
Football Bourg-en-Bresse Péronnas 01 players
FC Villefranche Beaujolais players
FC Vaulx-en-Velin players
Association football midfielders